Erotic art in Pompeii and Herculaneum has been both exhibited as art and censored as pornography. The Roman cities around the bay of Naples were destroyed by the eruption of Mount Vesuvius in 79 AD, thereby preserving their buildings and artefacts until extensive archaeological excavations began in the 18th century. These digs revealed the cities to be rich in erotic artefacts such as statues, frescoes, and household items decorated with sexual themes. The ubiquity of such imagery and items indicates that the treatment of sexuality in ancient Rome was more relaxed than current Western culture. However, much of what might strike modern viewers as erotic imagery, such as oversized phalluses, could arguably be fertility imagery. Depictions of the phallus, for example, could be used in gardens to encourage the production of fertile plants. This clash of cultures led to many erotic artefacts from Pompeii being locked away from the public for nearly 200 years.

In 1819, when King Francis I of Naples visited the Pompeii exhibition at the Naples National Archaeological Museum with his wife and daughter, he was embarrassed by the erotic artwork and ordered it to be locked away in a "secret cabinet", accessible only to "people of mature age and respected morals". Re-opened, closed, re-opened again and then closed again for nearly 100 years, the Secret Museum, Naples was briefly made accessible at the end of the 1960s (the time of the sexual revolution) and was finally re-opened for viewing in 2000. Minors are still only allowed entry to the once-secret cabinet in the presence of a guardian, or with written permission.

Phalluses 

The phallus (the erect penis), whether on Pan, Priapus or a similar deity, or on its own, was a common image. It was not seen as threatening or even necessarily erotic, but as a ward against the evil eye. The phallus was sculpted in bronze as tintinnabula (wind chimes). Phallus-animals were common household items. Note the child on one of the wind chimes.

Priapus 
A wall fresco which depicted Priapus, the god of sex and fertility, with his oversized erection, was covered with plaster (and, as Karl Schefold explains, even the older reproduction below was locked away "out of prudishness" and only opened on request) and only rediscovered in 1998 due to rainfall.
The Romans believed that he was a talisman protecting the riches of the house.

The second image, from Schefold, Karl: Vergessenes Pompeji: Unveröffentlichte Bilder römischer Wanddekorationen in geschichtlicher Folge. München 1962., with its much more brilliant colors, has been used to retouch the younger, higher resolution image .

Brothels 

It is unclear whether the images on the walls were advertisements for the services offered or merely intended to heighten the pleasure of the visitors. As previously mentioned, some of the paintings and frescoes became immediately famous because they represented erotic, sometimes explicit, sexual scenes.

One of the most curious buildings recovered was in fact a Lupanar (brothel), which had many erotic paintings and graffiti inside. The erotic paintings seem to present an idealised vision of sex at odds with the reality of the function of the lupanar. The Lupanare had 10 rooms (cubicula, 5 per floor), a balcony, and a latrina. It was not the only brothel. The town seems to have been oriented to a warm consideration of sensual matters: on a wall of the Basilica (sort of a civil tribunal, thus frequented by many Roman tourists and travelers), an immortal inscription tells the foreigner: If anyone is looking for some tender love in this town, keep in mind that here all the girls are very friendly (loose translation). Other inscriptions reveal some pricing information for various services: Athenais 2 As, Sabina 2 As (CIL IV, 4150), The house slave Logas, 8 As (CIL IV, 5203) or Maritimus licks your vulva for 4 As. He is ready to serve virgins as well. (CIL IV, 8940). The amounts vary from one to two asses up to several sesterces. In the lower price range the service was not more expensive than a loaf of bread.

Prostitution was relatively inexpensive for the Roman male but it is important to note that even a low priced prostitute earned more than three times the wages of an unskilled urban labourer. However, it was unlikely a freed woman would enter the profession in hopes for wealth because most women declined in their economic status and standard of living due to demands on their appearance as well as their health.

Prostitution was overwhelmingly an urban creation. Within the brothel it is said prostitutes worked in a small room usually with an entrance marked by a patchwork curtain. Sometimes the woman's name and price would be placed above her door. Sex was generally the cheapest in Pompeii, compared to other parts of the Empire. All services were paid for with cash.

Suburban baths 

These frescoes are in the Suburban Baths of Pompeii, near the Marine Gate.

These pictures were found in a changing room at one side of the newly excavated Suburban Baths in the early 1990s. The function of the pictures is not yet clear: some authors say that they indicate that the services of prostitutes were available on the upper floor of the bathhouse and could perhaps be a sort of advertising, while others prefer the hypothesis that their only purpose was to decorate the walls with joyful scenes, as these were in Roman culture. The most widely accepted theory, that of the original archaeologist, Luciana Jacobelli, is that they served as reminders of where one had left one's clothes.

Collected below are high-quality images of erotic frescoes, mosaics, statues, and other objects from Pompeii and Herculaneum.

Venus 

Venus was the divine protector of Pompeii, and featured in many frescoes around the city. The goddess of love, sex, and fertility, Venus was closely associated with eroticism and prostitution in ancient Rome. The mural of Venus from Pompeii was never seen by Botticelli, the painter of The Birth of Venus, but may have been a Roman copy of the then famous painting by Apelles which Lucian mentioned.

The fresco of Mars and Venus, located in the tablinum of the House of Mars and Venus, is believed to model the proper family roles of husband and wife for those entering the home. Mars and Venus, a popular couple from mythology, were represented in many house's tablinum for this reason. Venus has appeared in Pompeian artwork at least 197 times, the majority of these depictions located in a home's reception area where a guest would not need an invitation to enter, although she also appears on tavern signs and political banners. Previous scholarship assumed Venus would be more common in cubicula, small inclosed rooms that may function as a bedroom, due to her association with love and sex. Recent studies have shown this is not the case and that Venus is more commonly portrayed in large common rooms. Approximately one third of artwork featuring Venus represents some sort of love scene. There are two Venus types found almost eclusivley in Pompeii, Venus Pompeiana ("Venus of Pompeii") and Venus Pescatrice ("Venus the Fisher-woman"). Venus Pompeiana is depicted standing rigidly, usually trapped with a mantle and holding her right arm across her chest. She is most commonly depicted in places that would be seen by many people, possible to demonstrate a house's patron goddess or for protection as this form of Venus has special religious and ritual significance to Pompeii. Venus Pescatrice is typically shown sitting down, holding a fishing rod and is always semi-naked. The depictions of Venus Pescatrice are all similar in strucuter, suggesting they derive from the same source, though this source has not been found.

Gallery

See also 

 History of erotic depictions
 History of human sexuality
 Homosexuality in ancient Greece
 Homosexuality in ancient Rome
 Lupanar
 Sexuality in ancient Rome
 Roman art

References 

Bibliography
 
 
 
 

Pompeii
Herculaneum (ancient city)
Pompeii (ancient city)
Prostitution in ancient Rome